Wierzbowski (feminine Wierzbowska) is a Polish surname. Notable people with the surname include:

 Anna Wierzbowska (born 1990), Polish rower
 Krzysztof Wierzbowski (born 1988), Polish volleyball player
 Marek Wierzbowski, Polish lawyer
 Maria Wierzbowska (born 1995), Polish rower
 Trevor Wierzbowski, character in James Cameron's 1986 film Aliens

Polish-language surnames